The Bataan Risers, also known as 1Bataan Risers-Camaya Coast, are a professional basketball team in the Maharlika Pilipinas Basketball League. It is owned by the provincial government of Bataan.

They also fielded a team in 3x3 basketball. The Bataan Risers participated as the 1Bataan Risers in the Chooks-to-Go Pilipinas 3x3 and has also participated in the 2019 FIBA 3x3 World Tour as the Balanga Chooks.

History
They joined MPBL on the league's maiden season.

Current roster

Depth chart

Head coaches

All-time roster

 Melvin Bangal (2018–present)
 Arvie Bringas (2018–present)
 Christian Capuli (2018–present)
 JP Capuli (2018–present)
 Al Carlos (2018–present)
 Gary David (2018–present)
 Francis Ebidag (2018–present)
 Gio Espuelas (2018–present)
 Dennis Ignacio (2018–present)
 Edward Gallo (2018–present)
 Glenn Macalinao (2018–present)
 Niño Magno (2018–present)
 Khiel Misa (2018–present)
 Mark Montes (2018–present)
 JC Peñaflor (2018–present)
 Jay Sierra (2018–present)
 Alfhon Tuazon (2018–present)
 Dinmark Villar (2018–present)
 Kim Lintag (2018-present)

Season-by-season records
Records from the 2022 MPBL season:

References

 
Bataan Risers
2018 establishments in the Philippines
Basketball teams established in 2018
Chooks-to-Go Pilipinas 3x3 teams